The iHeartRadio Jingle Ball Tour 2016 is a national holiday tour by iHeartMedia, which began on November 29, 2016 in Dallas at the American Airlines Center. The tour ended on December 18, 2016 in Sunrise, Florida at the BB&T Center. The performance in New York City on December 9 benefited the Robin Hood homeless charity fund. It is the second highest grossing Jingle Ball Tour of all time following the Jingle Ball Tour 2014.

Performers

 Alessia Cara
 Ariana Grande
 Backstreet Boys
 Britney Spears
 Bruno Mars
 Camila Cabello
 Charlie Puth
 Daya
 Diplo
 DNCE
 Ellie Goulding
 Fifth Harmony
 G-Eazy
 Gnash
 Grace VanderWaal
 Hailee Steinfeld
 Justin Bieber
 Lukas Graham
 Machine Gun Kelly
 Martin Garrix
 Meghan Trainor
 Niall Horan
 Nicky Jam
 Nick Jonas
 Pitbull
 Shawn Mendes
 The Chainsmokers
 Tinashe
 Tove Lo
 Sabrina Carpenter

Shows

References

2016 concert tours